Rowley Griffiths (13 March 1895 – 21 April 1977) was an Australian rules footballer who played with St Kilda and Footscray in the Victorian Football League (VFL).

Notes

External links 

1895 births
1977 deaths
Australian rules footballers from Victoria (Australia)
St Kilda Football Club players
Western Bulldogs players